Jörg Mühle (born in Frankfurt in 1973) is a freelance illustrator, and author of children's books. He studied at the Hochschule für Gestaltung Offenbach am Main, and at the prestigious École nationale supérieure des arts décoratifs in Paris.

Mühle is known for the board book Nur noch kurz die Ohren kraulen? (published in English by Gecko Press as Tickle My Ears) which has sold over sixty thousand copies in Germany, and been translated into six languages.

Works

Children’s books
 Tickle My Ears – Gecko Press, 2016,  
 Bathtime for Little Rabbit – Gecko Press, 2017, 
 Poor Little Rabbit! – Gecko Press, 2018,

References

External links

 Official author website (German)
  Tickle my Ears by Jörg Mühle review
 English author profile

1973 births
Living people
German children's book illustrators
German children's writers